Kew railway station may refer to the following:

 Kew railway station (England), a former station in Kew, London, England, on the North and South Western Junction Railway, which closed in 1863
 Kew railway station, Melbourne, a former station in Victoria, Australia

See also 
 Kew Bridge railway station, a current station on the Hounslow Loop Line in Kew, London
 Kew Gardens station (disambiguation), for various stations of that name